This is a list of buildings at Gould Academy.

List of Buildings

References

Gould Academy